Ascarat is a commune in the Pyrénées-Atlantiques department in the Nouvelle-Aquitaine region of south-western France.

The inhabitants are known as Azkaratear.

Geography

Ascarat is located in the former province of Lower Navarre in the Aldudes Valley immediately north-west of Saint-Jean-Pied-de-Port. Access to the commune is by the D918 road from Saint-Jean-Pied-de-Port which passes through the length of the commune on the eastern side and continues to Louhossoa. The D15 road goes north-west from Saint-Jean-Pied-de-Port through the southern part of the commune continuing to Irouléguy. Access to the village is by country roads - Garategana from the D15 and Learraa from the D918. There are substantial forests in the commune however about 70% of the land area is farmland.

The Nive river forms the eastern border of the commune as it flows north to join the Adour at Bayonne. Three streams flow into the Nive in the commune: the Nive d'Arnéguy, the Nive de Béhérobie, the Berroko erreka, and the Pagolako erreka.

Places and hamlets

 Apelchénéa
 Arbelarréa
 Arrécharborda
 Béhérekoetchéa
 Bentaberria
 Beskinaénéa
 Bidartéa
 Bordia
 Burugorriénéa
 Caracotchéa
 Choko Ona
 Errékaldéa
 Fargas (château)
 Ferrandoénéa
 Garatégaïna
 Haranbiako Borda
 Harguinaénéa
 Harguinchuria
 Hirureta
 Indartéa
 Iputchaénéa
 Ithurraldéa
 Ithurricheta
 Jauberria
 Pontoussénéa
 Puchulua
 La Solitude
 Tofinaenea
 Uhaldéa

Toponymy
The name Ascarat appears in the forms: 
Ascarat (1106), 
Escarat (13th century), 
Azcarat (1350), 
Atzcarat (1366), 
Azquarat (1413), 
Axcarat (1513, Titles of Pamplona), 
Axcarate (1621, Martin Biscay<ref name="Martin Biscay">Derecho de naturaleza que la merindad de San-Juan-del-pie-del-puerto, una de las seys de Navarra, tiene en Castilla - 1622 petit in-4° </ref>), and Sanctus Julianus d'Ascarat (1763, Collations of the Diocese of Bayonne).

Jean-Baptiste Orpustan indicated that the name is composed of aitz ("rock") and garate ("high place"), giving "a height of rocks".Chubitoa was a hamlet in Ascarat and Anhaux, mentioned in 1863Jauréguy was a fief, vassal of the Kingdom of Navarre, cited in the 1863 dictionary as was Larragoyen.

The commune name in basque is Azkarate''.

History
The parish was mentioned in 1256 and was "ravaged by soldiers" in 1396.

In 1391 Saint-Étienne-de-Baïgorry included the modern communes of Anhaux, Ascarat, Irouléguy, and Lasse.

Heraldry

Administration

List of Successive Mayors

Inter-communality
The commune is part of nine inter-communal structures:
 the Communauté d'agglomération du Pays Basque;
 the SIVOS of Garazi;
 the SIVU Hiruen Artean;
 the AEP association of Anhice;
 the Energy association of Pyrénées-Atlantiques;
 the inter-communal association for sanitation of Ur Garbi;
 the inter-communal association for the management and development of the abattoir at Saint-Jean-Pied-de-Port;
 the joint association for the Drainage basin of the Nive;
 the association to support Basque culture.

Demography
In 2017 the commune had 321 inhabitants.

Economy
The commune is part of the production zone of the Appellation d'origine contrôlée (AOC) of Irouléguy and also of the AOC zone of Ossau-iraty.

Economic activity is mainly agricultural.

Culture and heritage

Civil heritage
There are several houses and farms in the commune which are registered as historical monuments. These are:
Uhaldea House (18th century)
Harizpea Farm (1587)
Chateau de Vergues (or Chateau  de Fargas) (18th century)
Houses and Farms (17th-19th centuries)

Religious heritage
The Church of Saint-Julien-d'Antioche is of medieval origin was heavily rebuilt in the 18th and 19th century.

Notable people linked to the commune
Pierre Narbaitz, born in 1910 at Ascarat and died in 1984 at Cambo-les-Bains, was a historian, writer, and a basque French academic of the Basque and French languages.

See also
Communes of the Pyrénées-Atlantiques department

References

External links
Ascarat on Géoportail, National Geographic Institute (IGN) website 
Azcarat on the 1750 Cassini Map

Communes of Pyrénées-Atlantiques
Lower Navarre